The German Association of Towns and Municipalities (Deutscher Städte- und Gemeindebund, DStGB) is a German central organisation of the municipal self-government which represents the interests of 14.000 towns and municipalities belonging to a county (Kreis) in Germany. A similar organisation exists with the Association of German Cities (Deutscher Städtetag), which represents the bigger cities. The DStGB is constituted federally. Its main office is located in Berlin. Current president of the DStGB since July 2020 is Ralf Spiegler, mayor of the city of Nieder-Olm. Honorary president is Roland Schäfer, former mayor of the city of Bergkamen. The organisation works publicly and releases press statements regarding questions of towns and municipalities in Germany. It did so for example several times in the European migrant crisis.

History 
A first association of cities in Germany was founded with the Reichsverband Deutscher Städte (Reich Association of German Cities) in 1909/10, followed by the Reichsverband der Deutschen Landgemeinden (Reich Association of German Rural Municipalities) in 1922. In 1933 these two and further organisations were merged mandatorily in Nazi Germany as Deutscher Gemeindetag (German Municipal Association). In 1945 the organisations were separated again. The German Association of Towns and Municipalities was founded in 1973 as a voluntary association of towns and municipalities. 1991 a European office in Brussels was founded. 1998 the main office moved to Berlin.

Member associations 
The association consists of several member associations, namely:
 Bayerischer Gemeindetag
 Gemeinde- und Städtebund Rheinland-Pfalz
 Gemeinde- und Städtebund Thüringen
 Gemeindetag Baden-Württemberg
 Hessischer Städte- und Gemeindebund
 Hessischer Städtetag
 Niedersächsischer Städtetag
 Niedersächsischer Städte- und Gemeindebund
 Saarländischer Städte- und Gemeindetag
 Sächsischer Städte- und Gemeindetag
 Schleswig-Holsteinischer Gemeindetag
 Städte- und Gemeindebund Brandenburg
 Städte- und Gemeindebund Sachsen-Anhalt
 Städte- und Gemeindetag Mecklenburg-Vorpommern
 Städte- und Gemeindebund Nordrhein-Westfalen
 Städtebund Schleswig-Holstein
 Städtetag Rheinland-Pfalz

External links 

 Official website of the Deutscher Städte- und Gemeindebund
 Eurocommunal – European office of the DStGB

References 

Political organisations based in Germany
Non-profit organisations based in Berlin
1973 establishments in Germany